George Mitchell (Chesterhall) Ltd v Finney Lock Seeds Ltd is a case concerning the sale of goods and exclusion clauses. It was decided under the Unfair Contract Terms Act 1977 and the Sale of Goods Act 1979.

Facts
Finney Lock Seeds Ltd agreed to supply George Mitchell (Chesterhall) Ltd with 30 lb of Dutch winter cabbage seed for £201.60. An invoice sent with the delivery was considered part of the contract and limited liability to replacing 'any seeds or plants sold' if defective (clause 1) and excluding all liability for loss or damage or consequential loss or damage from use of the seed (clause 2).  of crops failed, and £61,513 was claimed for loss of production.

The two main issues in the case were whether the limitation clause should be interpreted to cover the seeds actually sold, given that the seeds were wholly defective and so did not do a seed's job at all and whether, under the Unfair Contract Terms Act 1977, s 2(2) the limitation was reasonable (s 11).

Judgments

High Court
Parker J  held that the goods sold were not "seeds" at all and he did not look at the statute. On the basis that clause 1 said 'any seeds or plants sold', he held that what was sold could not be considered seeds (because they simply did not work) and therefore the exclusion in clause 2, which was attached to what was sold in clause 1, had no effect.

Court of Appeal
The majority, Oliver LJ and Kerr LJ, held the limitation clause did not apply because, like Parker J, they held that what was sold was not seed. However, Lord Denning MR dissented from the majority's reasoning and argued the clause applied to limit liability for the seeds sold even if the seeds were defective. Ultimately, all agreed that the clause was invalid under the Supply of Goods (Implied Terms) Act 1973 (see now s 55 SGA 1979 and UCTA 1977) because it was unreasonable.

In a memorable passage and his last-ever judgment, Lord Denning MR outlined the problem of the case in this way.

House of Lords
The House of Lords unanimously upheld the judgment of Lord Denning that the limitation of liability to the cost of the seeds was not effective, because given the relative positions and capability of insurance, it failed the reasonableness test. Lord Diplock gave the first judgment.

Lord Bridge gave the leading judgment. He agreed with Lord Denning MR that clause 2 applied to the seeds in question, and that it was a "strained construction" (following Lord Diplock's dicta in Photo Production Ltd v Securicor Transport Ltd  to say otherwise. At page 810 he said,

On the question of the term's fairness, Lord Bridge held,

On the question of fairness, the decisive evidence was that witnesses (for the seedsmen) had said the industry's practice had always been to negotiate damages claims if they seemed genuine and justified. That was clear recognition that the relevant condition would not be fair or reasonable.

Lord Scarman, Lord Roskill and Lord Brightman concurred.

In the House of Lords, Leonard Hoffmann QC and Patrick Twigg made submissions for George Mitchell and Mark Waller QC made submissions for Finney Lock Seeds.

Significance
George Mitchell was Lord Denning's last judgment in the Court of Appeal before he retired. His dissenting opinion, which was upheld by the House of Lords, was partly a riposte to the last century of common law, dating back at least to Printing and Numerical Registering Co v Sampson where Lord Jessel MR had propounded freedom of contract as a core public policy.

By contrast, Lord Denning thought that the ability of the courts to control unfair terms, now granted through legislation, had made it possible to apply sensible principles when construing contracts. There was no need to twist the meaning of words to reach a fair result, if unfair contract terms could be scrapped on the ground that one party had unequal bargaining power.

However, the contra proferentem rule  (as used in Houghton v Trafalgar Insurance Co. Ltd  to give a "fair result" through an unreasonable interpretation of an exemption clause) still forms part of the European Community's consumer protection law as imposed in the Unfair Consumer Contract Terms Directive.

See also

English contract law

Notes

References
F Kessler, ‘Contracts of Adhesion – Some Thoughts About Freedom of Contract’ (1943) 43(5) Columbia Law Review 629

Lord Denning cases
English unfair terms case law
English interpretation case law
1983 in British law
House of Lords cases
1983 in case law
Cabbage